De Eendracht (English: The Unity) is a smock mill in Anjum, Friesland, Netherlands which has been restored to working order. The mill is listed as a Rijksmonument, number 31556.

History
The first mill on this site was a horse mill, De Gortmolen van Bakker Lambert (English: Baker Lambert's barley mill), which was in existence by 1500. Circa 1760, this was replaced by a smock mill. On 24 May 1889 this mill was struck by lightning and burnt down. The replacement mill, De Eendracht, was built by millwright G R van Wieren of Janum, for miller Doeke Turkstra. Parts from a demolished oil mill were incorporated into the new mill, as were parts from the saw mill De Haan (English: The Cockerel), which had also been demolished. Both these mills had stood in Leeuwarden.

Auxiliary power was provided by a  Kromhout Type ER III hot bulb diesel engine. The mill was working commercially until 1964 and was sold on 12 May 1967 to the Gemeente Oostdongeradeel for ƒ3,500. The mill was restored by millwright Christiaan Bremer of Adorp, Groningen in 1971-72.

The mill is used as a tourist information office by the VVV, as well as being kept in working order. Further restoration work was undertaken in 1995.

Description

De Eendracht is what the Dutch describe as an "achtkante stellingmolen". It is a smock mill with a stage. The mill has a five-storey brick base. The smock and cap are thatched. The cap is winded by a tailpole and winch. This was made by millwrights Prins van Oranje, The Hague in 1876. The windshaft also carries the brake wheel which has 63 cogs. This drives the wallower (34 cogs) at the top of the upright shaft. At the bottom of the upright shaft, the great spur wheel (100 cogs) drives the lantern pinion stone nuts for the millstones (25 and 27 staves) and the lantern pinion stone nuts for the pearl barley stones (21 staves). All four pairs of stones are French Burrs, those used for flour milling are  diameter. The pearl barley stones are  diameter.

Public access
De Eendracht is open Tuesday to Saturday from 10:00 - 17:00, April - October, and Saturdays only from 10:00 to 17:00 November to March.

References

Windmills in Friesland
Windmills completed in 1889
Smock mills in the Netherlands
Rijksmonuments in Friesland
Grinding mills in the Netherlands
Octagonal buildings in the Netherlands